Phoebis philea, the orange-barred sulphur, is a species of butterfly found in the Americas including the Caribbean.

The wingspan is 68 to 80 mm. There are two to three generations per year in Florida and one in the northern part of the range with adults on wing from mid to late summer. The species habitat is in tropical scrub, gardens, fields, and forest edges. Orange-barred sulphurs are often found in large dense groups of mixed species, including the statira sulphur (Aphrissa statira), apricot sulphur (Phoebis argante), and the straight-line sulphur (Rhabdodryas trite). The species eats nectar from red-colored plants.

The larvae feed on Cassia species.

Subspecies
Phoebis philea philea (Linnaeus, 1763) (US to Brazil)
Phoebis philea huebneri Fruhstorfer, 1907 (Cuba)
Phoebis philea thalestris (Illiger, 1801) (Hispaniola)

Gallery

References

 
 

Coliadinae
Butterflies of North America
Butterflies of Central America
Butterflies of the Caribbean
Pieridae of South America
Butterflies of Cuba
Butterflies of Jamaica
Lepidoptera of Brazil
Fauna of the Amazon
Taxa named by Carl Linnaeus
Butterflies described in 1763